Mr. Stink is a book published in October 2009 and written by David Walliams and illustrated by Quentin Blake. The book has been adapted as a stage musical and has been made into a television film of the same name by the BBC shown during Christmas 2012 on BBC1.

Plot summary
Chloe is a 12-year-old girl living in an undisclosed British town, who wants to help a local tramp become her friend, Mr Stink, but she does not know how. She has written a story that her mother tore up because she wants Chloe to work at school and not waste time drawing. Chloe thinks that her mother does not love her as much as she loves her little sister. Chloe hides Mr Stink in the shed; her Mother wants to become an MP and wrote as her manifesto that homeless people must be taken off the streets. Chloe discovers that her father was a member of a rock band called the Serpents of Doom. Her parents soon find out about Mr Stink in the shed and Chloe's mother is invited onto a TV show and asked to bring Mr Stink along, so that he can discuss life as a homeless man. Mr Stink quickly becomes the star of the show and makes the audience laugh a lot. The people love him so much that he's invited to the Prime Minister's office. The Prime Minister wants Mr Stink to become a 'person who pretends to care for the homeless'. Chloe defends her friend, and they return home, where Mr Stink has to say goodbye and wander the streets for ever. Chloe starts writing her journey with Mr. Stink, which starts by "Mr. Stink stank..."

Characters

Chloe: an unhappy 12-year-old girl who has brown hair. She loves her father dearly but does not like her sister and mother. She is very lonely. She has no friends and dislikes Christmas. She doesn't like Mince pies, tinsel and that it never snows. The one thing Chloe loves is stories. Her only friend is Mr. Stink.
Mr. Stink: A stinky gentleman. He is known for being smelly. The only thing that smells worse is his beard. His only companion is his dog, Duchess—who enjoys sausages—and later Chloe. It is revealed later in the book that he is homeless because his house burnt down and his wife died. It also revealed he was very rich. His real name is Lord Darlington.
Annabelle Crumb: Chloe's 10-year-old sister who is a spiteful snob. Chloe's mother dotes on her. She is very athletic and musical. She wears her hair in bunches to bed. She takes part in many extra-curricular activities just to please her mother. Annabelle is also her mother's favorite.
Mr. Crumb: Chloe and Annabelle's father and Janet's husband. He fears his wife and is the only member of the Crumb family who is fond with Chloe at the start of the story
The Duchess: Mr. Stink's smelly, white Yorkshire Terrier, who is usually considered black by passers-by, because she is normally covered in a layer of soot and dirt.
Janet (Mrs.) Crumb: Chloe and Annabelle's archconservative mother and wife to Mr Crumb. A wannabe MP obsessed with her youngest daughter and being posh. She wants to drive the homeless off the streets and win a by-election. She also appears on a political debate show with Mr. Stink, much to her shock. Her proposed policies include deporting litterbugs, removing benefits for the unemployed and permitting video games only within the times of 4 PM and 4:01 PM.
Rosamund: A spiteful and popular girl, whose main target is always Chloe.
Raj: A humble, kind newsagent.

Publication
Mr. Stink was originally published by HarperCollins in October 2009 in hardcover format. A list of notable formats is as follows:

Television adaptation

A 60-minute film of Mr. Stink aired on 23 December 2012 on BBC One after it was originally scheduled to air on Boxing Day. The film was the most-watched in its 6:30-7:30 pm timeslot with 6.34 million viewers tuning in. It was also broadcast in 3D and was the BBC's first-ever narrative program to be filmed in 3D.

References

2009 British novels
British children's novels
British novels adapted into films
HarperCollins books
Novels by David Walliams
2009 children's books